Smokebush may refer to
 the plant genus Conospermum;
 the plant genus Cotinus (as "Smoke bush");
 the plant species Ptilotus obovatus;
 the plant species Adenanthos sericeus, but only in the cut flower industry;
 the plant species Buddleja madagascariensis.

See also Smoke tree